"Whoops Now" and "What'll I Do" are songs by American singer Janet Jackson from her fifth studio album, Janet (1993). They were released in January 1995 as the album's eighth and ninth and final single, respectively. The songs reached number one in New Zealand and peaked within the top 20 in several countries.

Background
"Whoops Now" and "What'll I Do" were released as a double A-side in Europe, Japan, and Oceania, whereas the latter was released on its own in Oceania as well as certain European markets. Both releases included janet.s "The Body That Loves You" as a B-side. "Whoops Now" was added as a hidden track on the regular edition of janet. after the interlude "Sweet Dreams", while the UK and Japanese pressings of the album list the tracks separately. An edited version of the song also appears on the international version of Jackson's first greatest hits package, Design of a Decade: 1986–1996. The shorter version omits the risqué coda about activities in Anguilla. A remix of "What'll I Do" by Dave Navarro appears on Jackson's second remix album janet. Remixed.

"What'll I Do" is a cover of a Johnny Daye song called "What'll I Do for Satisfaction", which was released in 1967 and written by Joe Shamwell and Steve Cropper.

Jackson performed both songs on the janet. Tour, while she only performed "Whoops Now" on The Velvet Rope Tour.

Critical reception
Music Week gave "Whoops Now" three out of five, adding that "this single has an uncharacteristic Motown feel to it and could zoom up the charts, helped by a cute accompanying video." 

Chart performance
The overall chart performances for the single was successful, charting inside the top ten in Austria, France, and the United Kingdom, and inside the top twenty in Australia (for "What'll I Do"; "Whoops Now" peaked at number forty-nine), Denmark, Germany, and Switzerland. "Whoops Now/What'll I Do" managed to peak at number one in New Zealand for one week.

Music video
The video for "Whoops Now" was directed by Yuri Elizondo, the younger brother of Jackson's ex-husband, René Elizondo Jr., and depicts Jackson and her friends having fun in Jackson's favorite vacation spot, Anguilla. It appears on the video compilation Design of a Decade 1986/1996. The video for "What'll I Do" is a concert performance taken from the janet. Tour, and has never been released commercially.

Track listingsUK CD single (VSCDT1533)UK 12" single (VSTY 1533)Dutch CD single (VSCDT 1533)Australian CD single (892845.2)"Whoops Now" (radio edit) – 3:42
"What'll I Do" – 4:05
"What'll I Do" (Dave Navarro Remix) – 4:20
"The Body That Loves You" – 5:33UK promo CD singleUK 7" single (VSY1533) (limited edition picture disc)UK 7" promo single (VSY1533)"Whoops Now" (radio edit) – 3:42
"What'll I Do" – 4:05French promo CD single (SA3487)"Whoops Now" (radio edit) – 3:42Australian CD single (892797.2)"What'll I Do" – 4:05
"That's the Way Love Goes" (We Aimsta Win Mix #1) – 5:42Japanese 3" CD single (VJDP-10242)"What'll I Do" (Dave Navarro Remix) – 4:20
"The Body That Loves You" – 5:33Japanese promo CD single (PCD-0576)"What'll I Do" (Red Hot Chili Peppers Mix) – 4:19
"What'll I Do" (album version) – 4:05

Official remixes"Whoops Now"Album version – 4:59
Radio edit – 3:42
Design of a Decade International Edit – 4:07"What'll I Do"'
Album version – 4:05
Dave Navarro Remix/Red Hot Chili Peppers Mix – 4:20

Charts

"Whoops Now"/"What'll I Do"

"What'll I Do"

Year-end charts

Certifications

References

1993 songs
1995 singles
Janet Jackson songs
Number-one singles in New Zealand
Song recordings produced by Jimmy Jam and Terry Lewis
Songs written by Janet Jackson
Songs written by Jimmy Jam and Terry Lewis
Virgin Records singles